"Rumor" is a song by American country music singer Lee Brice. It was written by Brice, along with Ashley Gorley and Kyle Jacobs. It was released to radio on July 16, 2018 as the second single from Brice's self-titled studio album. The song was also remixed by producer Bryan Todd.

Background
Brice wrote the song with Ashley Gorley and Kyle Jacobs. He said the song is a "natural throwback" to the small town he grew up in, where rumors travel quickly, be they true or false. The country song has been described as "blues-inflected ballad", and it is about a man and a woman who are so close together that people gossip about them, despite them not being in a relationship.

Commercial performance
The song was released for sale on September 4, 2018 followed by a video release. It first entered Billboards Country Airplay at number 59 and Hot Country Songs at number 44 on charts dated September 15, 2018. In July 2019, it became Brice's fifth number one single on the Country Airplay chart, and his first since "I Don't Dance" in August 2014. It was the highest-charting song of his career, peaking at number 25 on the Billboard Hot 100, until it was surpassed by "One of Them Girls", which peaked at number 17 the following year. The song was certified Platinum by the RIAA on July 2, 2019. It has sold 280,000 copies in the United States as of September 2019. It was nominated for single of the year at the 55th Academy of Country Music Awards.

Music video
The music video for the song was released on September 5, 2018. It was directed by Ryan "Spidy" Smith and shot in Nashville. The video features Brice's wife Sara who plays the main love interest in the video.

Was featured in the Hallmark movie, My One and Only in 2019.

Charts

Weekly charts

Year-end charts

Certifications

References

2018 songs
Lee Brice songs
Curb Records singles
Songs written by Ashley Gorley
Songs written by Kyle Jacobs (songwriter)